Henry George Plummer (22 April 1912 – 30 June 1993) was an Australian rules footballer who played with Essendon in the Victorian Football League (VFL).

After leaving Essendon, Plummer played for two seasons with Oakleigh in the Victorian Football Association (VFA).

Plummer later served in the Royal Australian Air Force during World War II.

Notes

External links 

1912 births
1993 deaths
Australian rules footballers from Tasmania
Essendon Football Club players
Oakleigh Football Club players
Royal Australian Air Force personnel of World War II
Royal Australian Air Force airmen
Military personnel from Tasmania